Vladimir Eduardovich Tkachev (born October 5, 1995) is a Russian professional ice hockey left winger who currently plays for Avangard Omsk of the Kontinental Hockey League (KHL).

Playing career
Tkachev was drafted by Avangard Omsk in the third round, 73rd overall, in the 2012 KHL Draft. He then began his career playing for the club's MHL affiliate, Omskie Yastreby. The following year, at the age of 17, he was selected by the Moncton Wildcats of the Quebec Major Junior Hockey League in the first round, 39th overall, in the 2013 CHL Import Draft. He soon after made his professional hockey debut with Avangard Omsk during the 2013–14 KHL season, playing two games with the club before being returned to Omskie Yastreby. Partway through the 2013-14 season, an IIHF transfer agreement was made between the CHL and the KHL for Tkachev to play with the Moncton Wildcats. Roger Shannon, the Director of Hockey Operations for the Wildcats, stated that it was to be "an exciting day to see this young superstar in a Wildcats jersey."

Junior hockey

2013–14 season
Tkachev debuted with the QMJHL's Moncton Wildcats on January 23, 2014. He scored four points that night and was named the game's first star in a 7-4 victory against the Chicoutimi Saguenéens. Wildcats coach Darren Rumble identified him as an "elite player" after his debut. He finished the 2013-14 QMJHL season with 10 goals and 20 assists for 30 points in 20 games. In his first QMJHL playoff campaign he scored 7 goals and 2 assists in 6 games.

Edmonton Oilers contract annulment
As an 18-year-old player, Tkachev was eligible for the 2014 NHL Entry Draft but went undrafted despite being listed 60th overall on the NHL Central Scouting Services' final 2014 North American skaters list. He was, however, invited to the Edmonton Oilers' training camp later that year. His performance in their training camp impressed the Oilers, and he was quickly signed to a three-year entry-level contract with the team. Oiler fans immediately anointed him "Vladdy Hockey" as a direct comparison to "Johnny Hockey" Gaudreau, a star player who plays for rival Calgary. The National Hockey League, however, rejected the contract, informing the Oilers that Tkachev was ineligible to be signed by any NHL team until the 2015 off-season because the Collective Bargaining Agreement stated that CHL players needed to play a full season in North America to be eligible if undrafted. The Oilers admitted not realizing that this clause existed, and Tkachev remained unsigned. He promptly returned to the Moncton Wildcats to continue his QMJHL career.

2014–15 season
The 2014-15 season began with great success for Tkachev as he scored nine points in his first five games, more points in that timeframe than anyone who was drafted in the 2014 NHL Entry Draft. After 13 games in the 2014-15 season he had accumulated 16 points, but on November 4, 2014, he suffered an injury and subsequently missed a month of action. Upon his return, Tkachev was traded to the Quebec Remparts for Taylor Burke in addition to a 7th and 8th round pick in the 2015 QMJHL Entry Draft. The decision was made on the basis that the Wildcats needed to readjust their roster for the future and to allow Tkachev an opportunity to play in the 2015 Memorial Cup, as the Quebec Remparts were slated to host the event. The Wildcats' Roger Shannon expressed his gratitude to Tkachev for "adding a spark" to the organization and thanked him for his time as a member of the team. In January 2015, the NHL's Central Scouting Services ranked him 121st overall with questions looming regarding his height and small 163-lb frame.

With the Quebec Remparts, Tkachev scored 12 goals and 21 assists in 33 games to help the team qualify for the 2015 QMJHL playoffs. During the playoffs, Tkachev scored six goals and 10 assists for 16 points in 21 games. The Remparts reached the QMJHL Final against the Rimouski Oceanic but were ultimately defeated in the seventh game of the seven-game series. As the host team for the 2015 Memorial Cup, the Remparts automatically qualified for that event. In the Memorial Cup, the Remparts were defeated in the semi-final against the Kelowna Rockets.

The NHL Central Scouting Services ranked Tkachev 159th overall in its final April 2015 rankings.

Professional
Tkachev opted to return to his native Russia to resume his professional career after his KHL right's were traded by Avangard to SKA Saint Petersburg on September 12, 2015. He later agreed to a two-year playing contract with SKA ten days later on September 22.

At the conclusion of his second productive season with Salavat Yulaev Ufa in 2018–19, Tkachev while in need of a new contract could not agree to terms with Ufa. On June 3, 2019, his rights were traded from Salavat back to SKA Saint Petersburg in exchange for the rights to Nikita Soshnikov. He was later signed to a two-year contract through 2021 with SKA on July 10, 2019.

On May 29, 2021, Tkachev as a free agent left SKA, and signed a one-year, entry-level contract with the Los Angeles Kings of the NHL. In his first professional North American season, Tkachev made the Kings opening night roster for the  season out of training camp. He made his long awaited NHL debut registering 2 assists in a season opening 6-2 victory over the Vegas Golden Knights on 14 October 2021.  Tkachev made 3 further appearances with the Kings before he was re-assigned to AHL affiliate, the Ontario Reign, for the remainder of the season, collecting 7 goals and 29 points through 41 games.

With limited opportunity with the Kings, in the off-season Tkachev's KHL rights were traded from SKA Saint Petersburg back to original club, Avangard Omsk, in exchange for financial compensation. He was signed to a two-year contract to rejoin Avangard Omsk on 20 June 2022.

Career statistics

Regular season and playoffs

International

References

External links

1995 births
Living people
Admiral Vladivostok players
Avangard Omsk players
Los Angeles Kings players
Moncton Wildcats players
Ontario Reign (AHL) players
Quebec Remparts players
Russian ice hockey left wingers
Salavat Yulaev Ufa players
SKA Saint Petersburg players
Sportspeople from Omsk
Undrafted National Hockey League players